Loïc Poujol (born 27 September 1989) is a French former professional footballer. He played as a midfielder for Sochaux, Paris FC and Rodez AF.

Career
Poujol was born in Rodez. He made his professional debut for FC Sochaux-Montbéliard on 8 August 2009 in a Ligue 1 game against AJ Auxerre. After a five-year spell with Sochaux in the top-flight league, he signed a two-year contract with the Championnat National side Paris FC on 3 July 2014.

Following release from Paris FC, Poujol signed an initial one-year contract with Rodez AF on 29 September 2016. He stayed at the club for five seasons, and was involved in promotions from Championnat de France Amateur in 2017 and Championnat National in 2019. He announced his retirement on 17 May 2021.

Career statistics

References

External links
 

People from Rodez
1989 births
Living people
Sportspeople from Aveyron
Association football midfielders
French footballers
Ligue 1 players
Ligue 2 players
Championnat National players
Championnat National 2 players
Championnat National 3 players
FC Sochaux-Montbéliard players
Paris FC players
Rodez AF players
France youth international footballers
Footballers from Occitania (administrative region)